Shahbudin Rahimtoola was a cardiologist based in Los Angeles, United States. He served as Distinguished Professor at the Keck School of Medicine, University of Southern California. Rahimtoola was credited for his contribution to two clinical syndromes namely the hibernating myocardium and 'prosthetic valve-mismatch'.

Early life and education

Rahimtoola was born in October 1931 to an illustrious family of Bombay. He obtained his initial education from St. Xavier's School and followed it up with entry to medical college in Bombay. Upon partition of the subcontinent in 1947 his family shifted to Pakistan and he continued his studies from Karachi.

Rahimtoola graduated MBBS from Dow Medical College in 1954. After completing house job at the Civil Hospital for three years he proceeded to United Kingdom for further education. He received the MRCP from the Royal College of Physician of Edinburgh in 1963 and he was awarded the Fellowship [FRCP] in 1972.

Career 

In 1963 Rahimtoola moved to the United States. He was initially associated with the Mayo Clinic there and eventually became co-director of Cardiac Catheterization Laboratory. On the clinical and teaching front Rahimtoola remained Associate Professor of Medicine at the University of Illinois and Chief of Cardiology, Cook County Hospital from 1969 to 1972. This was followed by being appointed Professor of Medicine at the University of Oregon – a post he held from 1972 to 1980. He then moved to California, where he was chief of the Division of Cardiology at University of Southern California from 1980 till 1992. In 1984 he became the first George C. Griffith Professor of Cardiology. In 1993 he rose to become Distinguished Professor at the Keck School of Medicine, University of Southern California. During the 1990s he also served as Chairman of Council on Clinical Cardiology at the American Heart Association. He was Trustee of the American College of Cardiology during the same period.

Overall Dr Rahimtoola has been best known for his work in valvular heart disease, coronary artery disease, results of cardiac surgery, and arrhythmias along with cardio-myopathy and congenital heart disease.

Dr Rahimtoola has remained Editor-in-Chief of Current Topics in Cardiology, a book series dedicated to research and publication for Physicians. He has also served as Editor of Modern Concepts of Cardiovascular Disease [publication of the American Heart Association] and Clinical Cardiology [publication of JAMA].

Rahimtoola also served on the editorial board of the Journal of the American College of Cardiology. His credentials stand at 1420 national and international presentations and lectures - 11 edited textbooks and 513 scientific articles published -these include 120 book chapters, 316 original and other scientific articles along with 67 editorials.

Accolades 
Shahbudin Rahimtoola has been termed as a 'contemporary giant' in field of Muslim contribution to medical research. Rahimtoola has also been labelled as 'Cardiologist of the World' and 'Father of Research' by the European Heart Journal in 2013.

Mayo Clinic's all-time top fifty practitioners list includes Shahbudin Rahimtoola.

The Oregon Health Sciences University has Shahbudin Rahimtoola's portrait placed in its Digital Commons section.

Awards 

Professor Rahimtoola has been at the forefront of numerous awards and citations principally from his research and teaching career.

From the National AHA he has received Citations for International Service and Outstanding Service. From the AHA Oregon Affiliate he was awarded ‘Salute to Research’ in 1985. And from the AHA Los Angeles Affiliate the Award of Merit and Special Recognition for Outstanding Contributions to the study and practice of Cardiology.

From the FDA he received the Harvey W. Wiley Medal.

In teaching, Rahimtoola was recipient of the William Osler Award from the University of Miami. He received the Gifted Teacher Award from the American College of Cardiology in 1986. In 1989 Rahimtoola was the recipient of the James B. Herrick Award from the American Heart Association. In 1996 he was awarded the Melvin L. Marcus Memorial Award from the International Society of Heart Failure.

From the Mayo Foundation he received the Distinguished Alumnus Award in 1998. He was conferred the Master of the college from the American College of Cardiology in 1999. The ACC further conferred on him the Distinguished Scientist Award in 2001.

In 2000 Rahimtoola was conferred the Hamdan Award in the Middle East.

In 2002 Rahimtoola was awarded the D.Sc. (Hon) by the University of Karachi in a ceremony held at the Governor House [Sindh].

In 2009 the European society of Cardiology awarded him the gold medal for his outstanding contribution to the development of Cardiology.

This was followed by the ACC [American College of Cardiology] honoring Lifetime Achievement status to Shahbudin in 2013.

In 2016 Shahbudin Rahimtoola was conferred the 'Distinguished Fellowship' Award at the World Congress of International Academy of Cardiology in Boston.

Publications 

Shahbudin Rahimtoola has been author of some prominent textbooks used in postgraduate study of Cardiovascular Medicine namely Coronary Bypass Surgery (1977), Infective Endocaritis (1978), Controversies in Coronary Heart Disease (1982) and Valvular Heart Disease (1997).

He has also been co-author of Shock in Mycardial Infarction (1974), Acute Myocardial Infarction, 1st and 2nd editions (1991, 1997), Techniques and Applications of Interventional Cardiology (1991), Heart Failure (1995) and New Ischemic Syndromes (1997).

Marriage 

Shahbudin Rahimtoola married Shameem Virji in 1968. They have one son and two daughters from marriage.

Family 

Professor Shahbudin Rahimtoola's father Hoosenally Rahimtoola was a noted Legislator of the Bombay Presidency who remained Mayor of Bombay during British rule in India.

His brother, Professor Shamsuddin Rahimtoola remained a prominent Physician based out of Karachi. He remained Principal of the Dow Medical College and Medical Superintendent of the Civil Hospital there.

Death 

Dr Shahbudin Rahimtoola passed away on 9 December 2018 aged eighty seven at his residence in Palos Verdes Estates, California.

References

External links 

 

1931 births
2018 deaths
Medical doctors from Mumbai
People from Karachi
Muhajir people
Fellows of the Royal College of Physicians of Edinburgh
American Ismailis
Indian Ismailis
Pakistani Ismailis
Fellows of the American College of Cardiology
Physicians of the Mayo Clinic